The 2017 Taiwan Football Premier League (TFPL) was the first season of the Taiwan Football Premier League since it replaced the Intercity Football League following the 2016 season. It was contested by 8 clubs. Taichung City Dragon, who participated in the final Intercity Football League season, were replaced for the inaugural TFPL by Tainan City. Taipower FC finished at the top of the table, but were defeated 1-1 on away goals in a playoff by Tatung FC, the second ranked team, for the title. With that result, Tatung FC earned an automatic berth in the 2018 AFC Cup group stage, while Taipower FC qualified for the playoff round. However, neither side chose to enter the tournament, so 3rd place playoff winners Hang Yuen were granted the AFC Cup berth.

Teams
 Hang Yuen FC (represented by Fu Jen Catholic University)
 Ming Chuan University
 National Sports Training Center
 Hasus TSU
 Royal Blues FC
 Taipower FC
 Tatung FC
 Tainan City FC

Table

Playoff round

3rd Place Playoff
Summary

Matches

Hang Yuen won 5–2 on aggregate

Final
The two top placed teams in the division compete in a play-off to determine the league champions. The winners qualify for the AFC Cup Group stage, while the losers will play in the AFC Cup Qualification play-off preliminary round 2.

Summary

Matches

1-1 on aggregate, Tatung FC won on away goals.

Top scorers

References

2017
2017 in Asian association football leagues
2017 in Taiwanese football